Tetronarce is a genus of rays, commonly known as electric rays. They are slow-moving bottom-dwellers capable of generating electricity as a defense and feeding mechanism. Tetronarce species tend to attain a much larger size (up to 180 cm TL) than Torpedo species, which are usually small to moderate sized (range from 25 to 80 cm TL) electric rays.

Species
There are currently nine recognized species in this genus:

References

 
Fish of Argentina
Fish of Japan
Fish of Taiwan
Ray genera
Taxa named by Theodore Gill